The Oldsmobile Aurora is a luxury sedan, manufactured and marketed by General Motors from 1994 until 2003 over two generations — sharing platforms with Buick Riviera and using the Cadillac-derived G platform.  At the time of production, the Aurora was the flagship vehicle in the Oldsmobile lineup. It originated as the 1990 Cadillac Aurora concept using the Allante 4.5 V8 engine and all-wheel drive. 

The Aurora replaced the Toronado coupe and eventually the Oldsmobile 98, LSS and Regency in the Oldsmobile range — using V8 and V6 engines. It was equipped with a four-speed automatic transmission.

Introduction
GM developed the Aurora to rejuvenate Oldsmobile,  basing its design on the 1989 Oldsmobile Tube Car concept car, using a variant of Cadillac's Northstar 4.6-liter V-8 engine.

By the Aurora's introduction, Oldsmobile sales had fallen from a record high of 1,066,122 in 1985 to 402,936 in 1993.  Competition from Acura, Infiniti and Lexus offered similar products that benefited from superior durability and reliability reputations. The Aurora bore no Oldsmobile badging save for the radio-CD-cassette deck and engine cover. Instead, the Aurora used a stylized A emblem, foreshadowing a similar restyling of Oldsmobile's corporate "rocket" emblem for 1997.

Oldsmobile subsequently borrowed Aurora styling cues from the Aurora for its Intrigue and compact Alero models.

Concept
Early design work on what would become the Aurora began as early as the late 1980s with the 1989 Oldsmobile Tube Car engineering concept,  designed by Bud Chandler.  In addition to the overall similar shape, the Tube Car featured many detailed elements that were later found on the production automobile, including a full-width taillamp, wraparound rear windshield, and frameless windows. Unlike the eventual production car, the Tube Car used a pillarless hardtop design with suicide doors. The final production design was signed off on in July 1989, originally set for a 1992 start of production.

First generation (1995–1999)

The Aurora went into production on January 24, 1994, and was released for the 1995 model year, featuring dual-zone climate control, driver and front passenger airbags, leather seating surfaces, genuine burl walnut interior accents, six-speaker sound system with in-dash cd-cassette, and eight-way power adjustable front seats with 2-position memory.  An onboard computer displaying the date, current gas consumption, and other information was also standard, and was mounted in the center of the dashboard, above the factory radio and climate controls.  Options included a power sunroof, Bose Acoustimass premium amplified sound system, heated front seats, and Autobahn package.

The Aurora came standard with Oldsmobile's  L47 V8 engine, a DOHC engine based on Cadillac's 4.6 L Northstar V8. The Northstar engine and 4T80-E had been exclusive to Cadillac prior to the Aurora. The L47 put out  at 5600 rpm and  torque at 4400 rpm. The Aurora used a four-speed automatic transmission with driver selectable "normal" and "power" shift modes. A highly modified  version of this engine was used by General Motors racing division initially for Indy Racing League and IMSA competition starting in 1995 with the GM-supported Aurora GTS-1 racing program, then was later used in the Cadillac Northstar LMP program in 2000.  Both engines retained the 4.0 L capacity, but the Northstar LMP version was twin-turbocharged.  The Aurora had a drag coefficient of 0.32.

The Aurora was noted for its engine, build quality, ride, and structural integrity. During normal crush-to-failure tests to evaluate body torsional rigidity, the Aurora's unibody construction broke GM's testing machine. A frame-crusher otherwise used to test stronger truck frames had to be used, with the car twice exceeding federal standards for passenger cars.

First-generation Auroras were manufactured in Lake Orion, Michigan, along with the Buick LeSabre, Buick Park Avenue, Buick Riviera, Oldsmobile 88, Oldsmobile 98 and Pontiac Bonneville.

Year-to-year changes

1996 

For 1996, Oldsmobile made some minor revisions to the Aurora including new rear glass which has less distortion than previous models.
Further revisions include daytime running lights and OBD II compliant on-board diagnostic systems, tweaking the climate control and safety alarm, a revised keyless entry system with new features was and the short list of optional equipment was expanded to include chrome wheels and a gold trim package. The 1996-'99 models also had the passenger temperature toggle buttons on the middle right portion of the instrument panels replaced with air recirculator buttons.

1997 
There were minor changes for the Aurora in 1997. A new in-dash CD player for the Bose sound system highlighted the improvements. Another new feature was a tilt-down right-outside mirror that enhances the driver's view of close objects, whenever the shifter is placed in reverse.
The underside of the door handles were slightly recontoured to minimize slipping fingers when the handles are pulled. Seat belt release buttons were moved from the face of the buckle to the end for improved convenience. An electronic compass was added to the inside rear-view mirror. Larger front brakes came along with cast aluminum front control arms and steering knuckles. The rear ashtray assembly was changed from a click-lock face to a pull-up face. Finally, the spare tire cover and jack cradle assembly was changed from the jack and cover being bolted down to one where the jack sat in a plastic "bucket" inside the spare with the cover simply placed on top.
On some 1997s a modest "Oldsmobile" badge returned to the right-rear corner of the car along with the Aurora name.

1998 

The 1998 model had a few minor refinement changes to the brakes, suspension, steering and emissions controls. A new front control arm design with front hydraulic bushing and rear cross axis ball joint for enhanced ride smoothness and better isolation from road noise and vibration. Internal rebound springs added to front struts for improved body motion control and to minimize crash-through. Increased wheel travel (3 mm) and redesigned jounce bumpers for softer feel at full travel. Dual durometer cradle mounts for improved isolation. Premium valving and damping in the front and rear struts for a higher refinement in calibration. There were more accurate wheel sensors for improved ABS actuation. New steering calibration for more on-center feel and reduced parking effort.

GM's previously optional OnStar system, standard for this year, uses a dedicated button on the cellular telephone putting drivers in contact with an information center that can provide them with emergency assistance. The system uses no transmitters to determine the vehicle's location and provide route information to any destination.

Almost all of the changes made to the Aurora for 1998 were aimed at refining what was already a highly regarded suspension system.

1999 
The last year for the first generation Aurora; changes for 1999 included additional engine mounts for improved engine stability.

Production for this generation ended on June 25, 1999.  No 2000 models were produced.

Production Figures:

*Production figures for 1999 were not provided

Second generation (2001–2003)

Oldsmobile's original intention for the second generation was to move the Aurora further upmarket, retaining its V8-only drivetrain and sharing a platform with the new Buick Riviera, as the original Aurora had done. This would have created more room within the Oldsmobile lineup for a four-door Eighty-Eight successor known as the "Antares".  However, Buick dropped its Riviera development plans as fiscal trouble found Oldsmobile, so the division was forced to re-engineer the Antares into an acceptable Aurora in short time. Still using the G-body design, the re-engineered Aurora was the result, but retaining its 4.0 V8 Northstar still mounted to a 4T80-E automatic transmission.

Oldsmobile also offered a V6 engine in the Aurora for the first time. The V6 in question was the LX5, a cut-down relation of the DOHC Aurora V8, dubbed the "Shortstar."  The V6-powered Aurora was produced for the 2001 and 2002 model years only, with production ceasing in mid-2002.

 

This Aurora, though still a competitive luxury sedan, did not attract the attention, nor sales that the original did. This can be blamed on several reasons.  Most of all was that the new Aurora was overshadowed by GM's announcement in December 2000 that the Oldsmobile marque was to be phased out over the next several years.  Though still retaining its unique styling, it now also shared design cues with other Oldsmobiles.  The second generation Aurora was about six inches shorter than was the first generation.  Automobile magazine wrote that "The Aurora's new look is not quite as sensuous or elegant as that of the outgoing model," but the Auto Channel review said, "it was better in every respect."

The second generation Aurora went into production on November 1, 1999, and went on sale in February 2000 as a 2001 model. The last V6-powered Auroras rolled off the assembly line on June 21, 2002. The final 500 Auroras ended production on March 28, 2003. These were all a special burgundy color (called "Dark Cherry Metallic"), had special chrome wheels, and "Final 500" badging. The Orion, Michigan plant built a total of 71,722 second-generation Auroras; 53,640 in 2001, 10,865 in 2002, and 7,217 in 2003.

Standard and optional equipment
The second-generation (2001-2003) Oldsmobile Aurora featured as standard equipment, keyless entry, security alarm, luxury leather-trimmed seating surfaces with power adjustments for the driver's seat, an AM-FM stereo with radio data system (RDS) and cassette and single-disc CD players, a six-speaker sound system, leather door panel inserts, wood interior trim, automatic climate control, OnStar in-vehicle telematics system (later introduction), steering wheel-mounted climate and radio controls, a leather-wrapped steering wheel, power trunk release from the keyless entry remote, a multi-function driver's information center mounted above the factory radio and climate controls, a rear bench seat with fold-down center armrest, luxury-styled alloy wheels, a spare tire and wheel, automatic front head and fog lamps, a 3.5L V6 engine, a 4-speed automatic transmission, front-wheel-drive (FWD), front and side SRS airbags.

Optional equipment included a driver's memory package with memory front driver's seat and memory for radio presets, heated dual front bucket seats, a premium audio system with external amplifier by Bose, a power tilt-and-sliding sunroof, chrome-finished alloy wheels, a gold emblem package for the front and rear Oldsmobile emblems, Aurora emblem, and 3.5 or 4.0 emblems, and the 4.0L Northstar V8 engine (this engine became standard equipment in 2003 for the Aurora's final year of production). 

Starting in 2002, a voice-activated, CD-ROM based navigation system was available. The 17' wheel's plastic hub caps on the second generation V8 Auroras (except for the "Final 500" which used modified Cadillac wheels) were made with mold number 442.

Engines
 2001–2002: LX5 3.5 L (212 in³) V6,  @ 5600 rpm,  torque @ 4400 rpm.
 2001–2003: L47 4.0 L (244 in³) V8,  @ 5600 rpm,  torque @ 4400 rpm.

Production numbers
Production numbers for both generations of the Aurora:

Pace car

Aurora was the official pace car of the 1997 and 2000 Indianapolis 500.  At the beginning of the race in 1997, the pace car was driven by three-time Indy 500 winner Johnny Rutherford.  At the beginning of the 2000 race, the pace car was driven by actor Anthony Edwards.  These cars marked the ninth and tenth time an Oldsmobile had paced the Indianapolis 500 race.

See also
Northstar engine series

References

Further reading

External links

 Aurora Club of North America (ACNA) Forums
 The Oldsmobile Connection Forums
 Oldsmobile Club of America
 Toronado/Aurora Chapter of the Oldsmobile Club of America

Aurora
Front-wheel-drive vehicles
Full-size vehicles
Sedans
Cars introduced in 1994
2000s cars